Sheikh Bedreddin Mahmud bin Israel bin Abdulaziz (1359–1420) was an influential mystic, scholar, theologian, and revolutionary. He is best known for his role in a 1416 revolt against the Ottoman Empire, in which he and his disciples posed a serious challenge to the authority of Sultan Mehmed I and the Ottoman state.

Early life
Many details of Bedreddin's early life are disputed, as much of it is the subject of legend and folklore. He was born in 1359 in the town of Simavna (Kyprinos), near Edirne. His father was the ghazi of the town, and his mother was the daughter of a Byzantine fortress commander. He was born in a family with political and intellectual prominence. His grandfather was a high-ranking Seljuk officer. Notably, Bedreddin was of mixed Muslim and Christian parentage, with a Christian mother and a Muslim father; this contributed to his syncretic religious beliefs later in life. Turkish scholar Cemal Kafadar argues that Bedreddin's ghazi roots may also have contributed to his commitment to religious coexistence. In his youth he was a kadi to Ottoman warriors on the marches, which gave him ample experience in jurisprudence, a field of study in which he would become well-versed. Bedreddin was exposed to a variety of different cultures during his education, traveling far from his birthplace in Thrace. He studied theology in Konya, and then in Cairo, which was the capital of the Mamluk sultanate. After this, he traveled to Ardabil, in what is now Iranian Azerbaijan. Ardabil was under the control of the Timurids, and was home to the mystic Safavid order. Surrounded by mystics and far removed from the religious norms of the Ottoman Empire, Bedreddin was in an excellent place to cultivate his unconventional religious ideology. There he found an environment sympathetic to his pantheistic religious beliefs, and particularly the doctrine of "oneness of being". This doctrine condemned oppositions such as those of religion and social class as interference in the oneness of God and the individual, and such doctrine ran contrary to increasing Ottoman efforts to establish Sunni Islam as the state religion. By adopting it, Bedreddin further established himself as a subversive.

During the Ottoman Interregnum after the defeat of sultan Bayezid I by Tamerlane in 1402, Bedreddin served as the kadiasker, or chief military judge, of the Ottoman prince Musa as Musa struggled with his brothers for control of the Ottoman sultanate. Along with the frontier bey Mihaloglu, he was a chief proponent of Musa's revolutionary regime. While kadiasker, Bedreddin gained the favor of many frontier ghazis by distributing timars among them. Through this he aided these unpaid ghazis in their struggle against centralization, a clear indication of his subversive side.

Revolt of 1416
After Musa’s defeat by Ottoman sultan Mehmed I in 1413, Bedreddin was exiled to Iznik, and his followers were dispossessed of their timars. However, he soon decided to capitalize on the climate of opposition to Mehmed I following the disorder of the still-fresh interregnum. Leaving his exile in Iznik in 1415, Bedreddin made his way to Sinop and from there across the Black Sea to Wallachia. In 1416, he raised the standard of revolt against the Ottoman state.

Most of the revolts that ensued took place in regions of Izmir, Dobrudja, and Saruhan. The majority of his followers were Turcomans. The rest included frontier ghazis, dispossessed sipahis, medrese students, and Christian peasants. The first of these rebellions was kindled in Karaburun, near Izmir. There, Borkluje Mustafa, one of Bedreddin’s foremost disciples, instigated an idealistic popular revolt by preaching the communal ownership of property and the equality of Muslims and Christians. Most those who revolted were Turkish nomads, but Borkluje’s followers also included many Christians. In total, approximately 6,000 people revolted against the Ottoman state in Karaburun. Torlak Kemal, another of Bedreddin’s followers, led another rebellion in Manisa, and Bedreddin himself was the leader of a revolt in Dobrudja, in contemporary northeastern Bulgaria. The heartland for the Dobrudja revolt was in the Deliorman region south of the Danube Delta. Bedreddin found disciples among many who were discontent with sultan Mehmed; he became a figurehead for those who felt they had been disenfranchised by the sultan, including disgruntled marcher lords and many of those who had been given timars by Bedreddin as Musa's kadiasker, which had been revoked by Mehmed.

These uprisings posed a serious challenge to the authority of Mehmed I as he attempted to reunite the Ottoman Empire and govern his Balkan provinces. Although they were all eventually stifled, the series of coordinated revolts instigated by Bedreddin and his disciples was suppressed after only great difficulty. Torlak Kemal's rebellion in Manisa was crushed and he was executed, along with thousands of his followers. Borkluje's rebellion put up more of a fight than the others, defeating first the army of the governor of Saruhan and then that of the Ottoman governor Ali Bey, before it was finally crushed by the Vizier Bayezid Pasha. According to the Greek historian Doukas, Bayezid slaughtered unconditionally to ensure the rebellion's defeat, and Borkluje was executed along with two thousand of his followers. Sheikh Bedreddin's own Dobrudja rebellion was a short-lived one, and came to an end when Bedreddin was apprehended by Mehmed's forces and taken to Serres. Accused of disturbing the public order by preaching religious syncretism and the communal ownership of property, he was executed in the marketplace.

Thought and writings
Sheikh Bedreddin was a prolific writer and religious scholar, and a distinguished member of the Islamic religious hierarchy. He is often regarded as a talented voice in religious sciences, particularly for his thoughts on Islamic law. For his works on jurisprudence he is classed among the great scholars of Islamic thought. On the other hand, many condemn him as a heretic for his radical ideas on religious syncretism. Bedreddin advocated overlooking religious difference, arguing against zealous proselytism in favor of a utopian synthesis of faiths. This latitudinarian interpretation of religion was a major part of what allowed him and his disciples to instigate a broad-reaching popular revolt in 1416, unifying a very heterogeneous base of support.

Bedreddin's religious origins were as a mystic. His form of mysticism was greatly influenced by the work of Ibn al-‘Arabi, and he is known to have written a commentary of al-‘ Arabi's book Fusus al-hikam (The Quintessence of Wisdom). Through his writings, he developed his own form of mysticism. His most significant book, Varidat, or Divine Inspirations, was a compilation of his discourses which reflected on his ideas about mysticism and religion. Bedreddin was a monist, believing that reality is a manifestation of God's essence, and that the spiritual and physical worlds were inseparable and necessary to one another. As he writes in Varidat, he believed that "This world and the next, in their entirety, are imaginary fantasies; heaven and hell are no more than the spiritual manifestations, sweet and bitter, of good and evil actions."

Bedreddin's pantheistic beliefs greatly influenced many of his political and social ideas, particularly the doctrine of "oneness of being." This doctrine condemns oppositions which its adherents believe hinder the oneness of the individual with God, including oppositions between religions and between the privileged and the powerless. This belief system is reflected in the beliefs of Bedreddin and his disciples, who, among other things, preached that all religions are essentially the same, as well as that ownership of property should be communal. Such ideas appealed greatly to those who felt marginalized in Ottoman society, and this egalitarian ideology played a major role in inspiring popular revolt in 1416.

Sheikh Bedreddin clearly had ambitious political aspirations when he began his rebellion. According to the 15th-century Sunni historian Idris of Bitlis, Bedreddin considered himself the Mahdi, who would bring about God's unity in the world by distributing his lands among his followers. Although Idris' account is partial, Bedreddin's ambitions as a political and religious leader are apparent. He even went so far as to claim that he was descended from the Seljuk royal house, undoubtedly to bolster his legitimacy as a potential ruler. It is plausible that he aspired to win the sultanate.

Impact 

The revolt of 1416 marked a turning point in the toleration of non-Muslims by the Ottoman state. By crushing the rebellion aggressively and stigmatizing those who revolted, the state condemned popular discontent as illegitimate and further defined its position of opposition to religious nonconformists. After the revolt, Turco-Muslim presence in the Balkans became equivalent to an Ottoman presence. Bedreddin's rebellion made it clear to Ottoman statesmen that religious dissidence could pose a serious threat to their administrative structure, and in the years that followed, Murad II, Mehmed's successor, took steps to ensure that Islam was further established as the state's religion. For example, Murad expanded the Janissaries in the wake of the Bedreddin revolt to increase Ottoman military power, but also to create a steady flow of Christians being converted to Islam.

Sects of Bedreddin's followers continued to survive long after his death. His teachings remained influential, and his sectarians were considered a threat until the late sixteenth century. Known as the Simavnis or the Bedreddinlus, a sect of his followers in Dobrudja and Deliorman continued to survive for hundreds of years after his execution. Unsurprisingly, the Ottoman government viewed this group with great suspicion. In the sixteenth century, they were regarded as identical to the Kizilbash, and persecuted along with them. Some of Bedreddin's doctrines also became common among some other mystic sects. One such sect was the Bektashi, a dervish order commonly associated with the Janissaries.

Sheikh Bedreddin continues to be known in Turkey, especially among socialists, communists, and other political leftists. In the twentieth century, he was brought back into the spotlight by the communist Turkish writer Nazim Hikmet, who wrote The Epic of Sheikh Bedreddin to voice opposition to the rise of fascism in the 1930s. Hikmet's work popularized Bedreddin as a historical champion of socialism and an opponent of fascist tyranny, and his name has remained well known to those on the left of the political spectrum. His bones were exhumed in 1924, but his devotees were so fearful of a backlash against Bedreddin's newfound political significance by the Turkish government that he was not buried until 1961. He was finally put to rest near the mausoleum of Mahmud II, in Istanbul.

Books on Sheikh Bedreddin in Turkish
 Cemil Yener : Varidat, İstanbul : Elif Yayınları, 1970.
 Erol Toy : Azap ortakları, 1973.
 Vecihi Timuroğlu : Şeyh Bedrettin Varidat Ankara : Türkiye Yazıları Yayınları, 1979
 İsmet Zeki Eyüboğlu : Şeyh Bedreddin Varidat, Derin Yayınları, 1980
 Cengiz Ketene: Varidat: Simavna Kadısıoğlu Şeyh Bedreddin Simavi, 823/1420 ; trc. Cengiz Ketene, Ankara : Kültür Bakanlığı, 1990.
 Seyyid Muhammed Nur : Varidat şerhi .  Simavna Kadısıoğlu Şeyh Bedreddin Simavi, 823/1420 ; Haz. Mahmut Sadettin Bilginer, H. Mustafa Varlı, İstanbul : Esma Yayınları, 1994
Radi Fiş: Ben De Halimce Bedreddinem    Evrensel Basım Yayın.
Nazım Hikmet: Şeyh Bedrettin Destanı YKY.
Mine G. Kirikkanat, Gulun Oteki Adi (The Other Name Of The Rose)

Works cited 
 Finkel, Caroline. Osman’s Dream: The Story of the Ottoman Empire 1300-1923. New York: Basic Books, 2005
 Hikmet, Nâzım, Poems of Nazim Hikmet. . Tr. by Randy Blasing and Mutlu Konuk. New York: Persea Books, 1994.
 Imber, Colin. The Ottoman Empire, 1300-1650. Houndmills: Palgrave Macmillan, 2009.
 İnalcık, Halil. The Ottoman Empire: The Classical Empire 1300-1600. New York: Praeger Publishers, 1973.
 Kafadar, Cemal. Between Two Worlds: The Construction of the Ottoman State. Berkeley: University of California Press, 1995
 Lowry, Heath. The Nature of the Early Ottoman State. Albany: State University of New York Press, 2003.

References 

1359 births
1420 deaths
15th-century people from the Ottoman Empire
Kazasker
15th-century Muslim theologians
14th-century Muslim theologians
Ottoman period in Anatolia
People of the Ottoman Interregnum
Ottoman Sufis
People executed by the Ottoman Empire by hanging
Rebels from the Ottoman Empire
Turkish Muslims
Pantheists